Beet is the second full-length album by Chicago, Illinois rock band Eleventh Dream Day and their first on a major label, Atlantic Records.

Critical reception

Chicago Reader wrote: "Beet, recorded over a leisurely four days, is a hoot. Lissome guitar lines float in and amongst varying degrees of thunder riffing; Rizzo's voice flails wildly above the mix."

Track listing
 "Between Here and There" (Baird Figi, Rick Rizzo) - 4:45
 "Testify" (Rizzo) - 4:03
 "Bagdad's Last Ride" (Janet Beveridge Bean) - 4:04
 "Awake I Lie" (Rizzo) - 5:20
 "Road That Never Winds" (Rizzo)	 - 3:22
 "Axle"	(Rizzo) - 3:42
 "Michael Dunne" (Figi, Rizzo) - 3:28
 "Bomb the Mars Hotel" 	(Figi) - 3:32
 "Teenage Pin Queen" (Rizzo) - 3:58
 "Love to Hate to Love" (Rizzo) - 3:31
 "Go (Slight Return)"   (Bean, Rizzo) - 4:06
Bonus tracks
 "Seiche"  (Figi) - 3:07  On CD only

Personnel
Janet Beveridge Bean  – piano, drums, vocals
Baird Figi –  guitar, background vocals, lap steel guitar
Douglas McCombs  – bass, background vocals
Rick Rizzo  – guitar, vocals

References

1989 albums
Eleventh Dream Day albums